This is a list of destinations that Air Caraïbes serves or has previously served with scheduled flights . It does not include destinations operated to solely by its interline or codeshare partners, such as its sister airline French Bee.

List

References 

Lists of airline destinations